The 2004–05 Tunisian Ligue Professionnelle 1 season was the 79th season of top-tier football in Tunisia.

Results

League table

Result table

Leaders

References
2004–05 Ligue 1 on RSSSF.com

Tunisian Ligue Professionnelle 1 seasons
1
Tun